JoAnn Ward (born July 4, 1946) is an American politician and former member of the Minnesota House of Representatives. A member of the Minnesota Democratic–Farmer–Labor Party (DFL), she represented District 53A in the east-central Twin Cities metropolitan area.

Education
Ward attended Kansas State University, graduating with a B.S. in education. She later attended the University of St. Thomas, graduating with a M.A. in education.

Minnesota House of Representatives
Ward was first elected to the Minnesota House of Representatives in 2012.

Personal life
Ward is married to her husband, Joseph. They have three children and reside in Woodbury, Minnesota. She is a former high school teacher.

References

External links

Rep. JoAnn Ward official campaign website

1946 births
Living people
People from Woodbury, Minnesota
Kansas State University alumni
University of St. Thomas (Minnesota) alumni
Schoolteachers from Minnesota
Democratic Party members of the Minnesota House of Representatives
Women state legislators in Minnesota
21st-century American politicians
21st-century American women politicians